The Royal Automobile Club of Tasmania normally abbreviated to RACT is a motoring club in Tasmania, Australia.  The organisation was established in 1923 and now has over 200,000 members. It is a member of the Australian Automobile Association.  It provides services such as roadside assistance, vehicle, home and contents insurance, personal and car loans, driver's education and tourism.

In addition to consumer services, the club also engages in consumer advocacy, particularly in regard to petrol prices, which are both historically and recently higher than prices in other parts of Australia.

References

External links
RACT Official Site

Automobile associations in Australia
Automobile Club of Tasmania, Royal
Transport in Tasmania
1922 establishments in Australia
Emergency road services